The 2014–15 Utah Jazz season is the franchise's 41st season in the National Basketball Association (NBA), and the 36th season of the franchise in Salt Lake City.

Preseason

Draft picks

Roster

Regular season

Standings

Game log

Preseason

|- style="background:#bfb;"
| 1 || October 7 || Portland
| 
| Alec Burks (12)
| Favors & Gobert (11)
| Trey Burke (4)
| EnergySolutions Arena17,858
| 1–0
|- style="background:#bfb;"
| 2 || October 9 || Portland
| 
| Trey Burke (22)
| Enes Kanter (10)
| Trey Burke (7)
| Moda Center14,468
| 2–0
|- style="background:#bfb;"
| 3 || October 13 || L.A. Clippers
| 
| Trey Burke (16)
| Rudy Gobert (20)
| Trey Burke (8)
| EnergySolutions Arena19,319
| 3–0
|- style="background:#bfb;"
| 4 || October 16 || @ L.A. Lakers
| 
| Gordon Hayward (16)
| Enes Kanter (11)
| Exum & Burke (6)
| Honda Center8,931
| 4–0
|- style="background:#fcc;"
| 5 || October 17 || @ L.A. Clippers
| 
| Gordon Hayward (22)
| Derrick Favors (10)
| Trey Burke (6)
| Staples Center17,733
| 4–1
|- style="background:#fcc;"
| 6 || October 19 || @ L.A. Lakers
| 
| Alec Burks (21)
| Rudy Gobert (10)
| Dante Exum (5)
| Staples Center17,733
| 4–2
|- style="background:#bfb;"
| 7 || October 19 || @ Oklahoma City
| 
| Enes Kanter (27)
| Derrick Favors (15)
| Gordon Hayward (6)
| Chesapeake Energy Arena
| 5–2
|- style="background:#fcc;"
| 8 || October 24 || Phoenix
| 
| Gordon Hayward (24)
| Booker, Hood & Gobert (8)
| Hayward & Gobert (3)
| EnergySolutions Arena18,087
| 5–3

Regular season

|- style="background:#fcc;"
| 1 || October 29 || Houston
| 
| Alec Burks (18)
| Gordon Hayward (8)
| Gordon Hayward (7)
| EnergySolutions Arena19,911
| 0–1
|- style="background:#fcc;"
| 2 || October 30 || @ Dallas
| 
| Derrick Favors (17)
| Derrick Favors (11)
| Trey Burke (7)
| American Airlines Center19,697
| 0–2

|- style="background:#cfc;"
| 3 || November 1 || Phoenix
| 
| Derrick Favors (32)
| Gordon Hayward (10)
| Trey Burke (4)
| EnergySolutions Arena17,721
| 1–2
|- style="background:#fcc;"
| 4 || November 3 || @ L.A. Clippers
| 
| Gordon Hayward (27)
| Enes Kanter (9)
| Gordon Hayward (5)
| Staples Center19,060
| 1–3
|- style="background:#cfc;"
| 5 || November 5 || Cleveland
| 
| Favors & Hayward (21)
| Derrick Favors (10)
| Gordon Hayward (7)
| EnergySolutions Arena19,911
| 2–3
|- style="background:#fcc;"
| 6 || November 7 || Dallas
| 
| Alec Burks (14)
| Enes Kanter (10)
| Dante Exum (5)
| EnergySolutions Arena18,419
| 2–4
|- style="background:#cfc;"
| 7 || November 9 || @ Detroit
| 
| Gordon Hayward (17)
| Derrick Favors (12)
| Dante Exum (5)
| Palace of Auburn Hills12,888
| 3–4
|- style="background:#fcc;"
| 8 || November 10 || @ Indiana
| 
| Gordon Hayward (30)
| Gordon Hayward (8)
| Trey Burke (8)
| Bankers Life Fieldhouse12,513
| 3–5
|- style="background:#fcc;"
| 9 || November 12 || @ Atlanta
| 
| Alec Burks (22)
| Gordon Hayward (7)
| Trey Burke (11)
| Philips Arena12,595
| 3–6
|- style="background:#cfc;"
| 10 || November 14 || @ New York
| 
| Gordon Hayward (33)
| Derrick Favors (12)
| Trey Burke (8)
| Madison Square Garden19,812
| 4–6
|- style="background:#fcc;"
| 11 || November 15 || @ Toronto
| 
| Favors & Kanter (18)
| Alec Burks (10)
| Hayward & Burke (5)
| Air Canada Centre19,800
| 4–7
|- style="background:#cfc;"
| 12 || November 18 || Oklahoma City
| 
| Alec Burks (20)
| Enes Kanter (15)
| Trey Burke (9)
| EnergySolutions Arena17,190
| 5–7
|- style="background:#fcc;"
| 13 || November 21 || @ Golden State
| 
| Enes Kanter (18)
| Derrick Favors (9)
| Ingles, Exum & Burke (5)
| Oracle Arena19,596
| 5–8
|- style="background:#fcc;"
| 14 || November 22 || New Orleans
| 
| Gordon Hayward (31)
| Derrick Favors (11)
| Trey Burke (4)
| EnergySolutions Arena18,452
| 5–9
|- style="background:#fcc;"
| 15 || November 24 || Chicago
| 
| Derrick Favors (21)
| Derrick Favors (15)
| Trey Burke (10)
| EnergySolutions Arena18,904
| 5–10
|- style="background:#fcc;"
| 16 || November 26 || @ Oklahoma City
| 
| Gordon Hayward (21)
| Gordon Hayward (8)
| Burke & Burks (4)
| Chesapeake Energy Arena18,203
| 5–11
|- style="background:#fcc;"
| 17 || November 29 || L.A. Clippers
| 
| Gordon Hayward (30)
| Trevor Booker (9)
| Alec Burks (4)
| EnergySolutions Arena18,479
| 5–12

|- style="background:#fcc;"
| 18 || December 1 || Denver
| 
| Gordon Hayward (25)
| Enes Kanter (15)
| Trey Burke (8)
| EnergySolutions Arena16,768
| 5–13
|- style="background:#fcc;"
| 19 || December 3 || Toronto
| 
| Favors & Kanter (19)
| Enes Kanter (9)
| Trey Burke (8)
| EnergySolutions Arena16,677
| 5–14
|- style="background:#fcc;"
| 20 || December 5 || Orlando
| 
| Derrick Favors (21)
| Derrick Favors (13)
| Trey Burke (11)
| EnergySolutions Arena18,997
| 5–15
|- style="background:#fcc;"
| 21 || December 8 || @ Sacramento
| 
| Gordon Hayward (19)
| Rudy Gobert (9)
| Gordon Hayward (7)
| Sleep Train Arena16,511
| 5–16
|- style="background:#cfc;"
| 22 || December 9 || San Antonio
| 
| Derrick Favors (21)
| Enes Kanter (15)
| Hayward & Burks (4)
| EnergySolutions Arena18,382
| 6–16
|- style="background:#fcc;"
| 23 || December 12 || Miami
| 
| Enes Kanter (25)
| Rudy Gobert (11)
| Burke & Gobert (4)
| EnergySolutions Arena19,911
| 6–17
|- style="background:#fcc;"
| 24 || December 14 || @ Washington
| 
| Alec Burks (19)
| Enes Kanter (11)
| Gordon Hayward (3)
| Verizon Center15,220
| 6–18
|- style="background:#fcc;"
| 25 || December 16 || @ New Orleans
| 
| Enes Kanter (29)
| Rudy Gobert (9)
| Gordon Hayward (5)
| Smoothie King Center13,179
| 6–19
|- style="background:#cfc;"
| 26 || December 17 || @ Miami
| 
| Gordon Hayward (29)
| Rudy Gobert (9)
| Gordon Hayward (7)
| American Airlines Arena19,633
| 7–19
|- style="background:#cfc;"
| 27 || December 19 || @ Orlando
| 
| Derrick Favors (23)
| Derrick Favors (10)
| Gordon Hayward (6)
| Amway Center16,032
| 8–19
|- style="background:#fcc;"
| 28 || December 20 || @ Charlotte
| 
| Gordon Hayward (14)
| Rudy Gobert (12)
| Gordon Hayward (6)
| Time Warner Cable Arena17,384
| 8–20
|- style="background:#cfc;"
| 29 || December 22 || @ Memphis
|  
| Alec Burks (23)
| Rudy Gobert (16)
| Hayward, Burks, Burke & Hood (4)
| FedExForum16,991
| 9–20
|- style="background:#cfc;"
| 30 || December 27 || Philadelphia
|  
| Favors & Burke (17)
| Derrick Favors (15)
| Trey Burke (4)
| EnergySolutions Arena18,890
| 10–20
|- style="background:#fcc;"
| 31 || December 29 || @ L.A. Clippers
|  
| Gordon Hayward (22)
| Rudy Gobert (13)
| Gordon Hayward (7)
| Staples Center19,060
| 10–21
|- style="background:#cfc;"
| 32 || December 30 || Minnesota
| 
| Hayward & Burke (26)
| Enes Kanter (12)
| Trey Burke (6)
| EnergySolutions Arena18,947
| 11–21

|- style="background:#fcc;"
| 33 || January 2 || Atlanta
| 
| Gordon Hayward (18)
| Derrick Favors (11)
| Trey Burke (5)
| EnergySolutions Arena19,029
| 11–22
|- style="background:#cfc;"
| 34 || January 3 || @ Minnesota
| 
| Trey Burke (28)
| Trevor Booker (15)
| Burke & Booker (6)
| Target Center13,702
| 12–22
|- style="background:#fcc;"
| 35 || January 5 || Indiana
| 
| Derrick Favors (27)
| Derrick Favors (11)
| Joe Ingles (7)
| EnergySolutions Arena17,378
| 12–23
|- style="background:#cfc;"
| 36 || January 7 || @ Chicago
| 
| Derrick Favors (20)
| Rudy Gobert (14)
| Gordon Hayward (5)
| United Center21,379
| 13–23
|- style="background:#fcc;"
| 37 || January 9 || @ Oklahoma City
|  
| Gordon Hayward (27)
| Derrick Favors (11)
| Ingles & Burke (5)
| Chesapeake Energy Arena18,203
| 13–24
|- style="background:#fcc;"
| 38 || January 10 || @ Houston
| 
| Burke & Kanter (16)
| Derrick Favors (7)
| Gordon Hayward (5)
| Toyota Center18,235
| 13–25
|- style="background:#fcc;"
| 39 || January 13 || Golden State
| 
| Derrick Favors (22)
| Favors & Gobert (11)
| Trey Burke (5)
| EnergySolutions Arena19,911
| 13–26
|- style="background:#cfc;"
| 40 || January 16 || L.A. Lakers
| 
| Gordon Hayward (31)
| Derrick Favors (10)
| Gordon Hayward (7)
| EnergySolutions Arena19,911
| 14–26
|- style="background:#fcc;"
| 41 || January 18 || @ San Antonio
|  
| Rudy Gobert (13)
| Rudy Gobert (18)
| Trey Burke (8)
| AT&T Center18,581
| 14–27
|- style="background:#fcc;"
| 42 || January 21 || @ Cleveland
| 
| Enes Kanter (24)
| Enes Kanter (17)
| Dante Exum (5)
| Quicken Loans Arena20,562
| 14–28
|- style="background:#cfc;"
| 43 || January 22 || @ Milwaukee
| 
| Gordon Hayward (24)
| Enes Kanter (16)
| Joe Ingles (7)
| BMO Harris Bradley Center12,415
| 15–28
|- style="background:#cfc;"
| 44 || January 24 || Brooklyn
| 
| Gordon Hayward (24)
| Rudy Gobert (11)
| Joe Ingles (5)
| Barclays Center19,352
| 16–28
|- style="background:#fcc;"
| 45 || January 26 || Boston
| 
| Gordon Hayward (26)
| Rudy Gobert (10)
| Joe Ingles (5)
| EnergySolutions Arena18,947
| 16–29
|- style="background:#fcc;"
| 46 || January 28 || L.A. Clippers
| 
| Enes Kanter (21)
| Enes Kanter (11)
| Joe Ingles (5)
| EnergySolutions Arena16,322
| 16–30
|- style="background:#cfc;"
| 47 || January 30 || Golden State
| 
| Gordon Hayward (26)
| Gordon Hayward (15)
| Trey Burke (7)
| EnergySolutions Arena19,295
| 17–30

|- style="background:#fcc;"
| 48 || February 3 || @ Portland
| 
| Gordon Hayward (27)
| Rudy Gobert (15)
| Trey Burke (6)
| Moda Center19,441
| 17–31
|- style="background:#fcc;"
| 49 || February 4 ||  Memphis
| 
| Trey Burke (21)
| Enes Kanter (10)
| Dante Exum (5)
| EnergySolutions Arena19,911
| 17–32
|- style="background:#fcc;"
| 50 || February 6 ||  @ Phoenix
| 
| Gordon Hayward (24)
| Rudy Gobert (12)
| Gordon Hayward (5)
| US Airways Center18,055
| 17–33
|- style="background:#cfc;"
| 51 || February 7 ||  Sacramento
| 
| Gordon Hayward (30)
| Enes Kanter (13)
| Derrick Favors (5)
| EnergySolutions Arena19,128
| 18–33
|- style="background:#cfc;"
| 52 || February 9 ||  @ New Orleans
| 
| Gordon Hayward (32)
| Enes Kanter (11)
| Gordon Hayward (8)
| Smoothie King Center15,321
| 19–33
|- style="background:#fcc;"
| 53 || February 11 ||  @ Dallas
| 
| Trey Burke (16)
| Enes Kanter (10)
| Gordon Hayward (8)
| American Airlines Center19,947
| 19–34
|- align="center"
|colspan="9" bgcolor="#bbcaff"|All-Star Break
|- style="background:#cfc;"
| 54 || February 20 ||  Portland
|  
| Gordon Hayward (20)
| Favors & Booker (9)
| Hayward, Exum & Burke (3)
| EnergySolutions Arena19,911
| 20–34
|- style="background:#cfc;"
| 55 || February 23 ||  San Antonio
| 
| Trey Burke (23)
| Rudy Gobert (14)
| Hayward & Ingles (3)
| EnergySolutions Arena18,782
| 21–34
|- style="background:#fcc;"
| 56 || February 25 ||  L.A. Lakers
| 
| Gordon Hayward (20)
| Rudy Gobert (14)
| Trey Burke (4)
| EnergySolutions Arena19,911
| 21–35
|- style="background:#cfc;"
| 57 || February 27 ||  @ Denver
| 
| Derrick Favors (21)
| Derrick Favors (10)
| Hayward & Ingles (5)
| Pepsi Center15,002
| 22–35
|- style="background:#cfc;"
| 58 || February 28 ||  Milwaukee
| 
| Trey Burke (23)
| Derrick Favors (12)
| Trey Burke (6)
| EnergySolutions Arena19,515
| 23–35

|- style="background:#cfc;"
| 59 || March 3 ||  @ Memphis
| 
| Favors & Hayward (21)
| Rudy Gobert (24)
| Dante Exum (7)
| FedExForum16,779
| 24–35
|- style="background:#fcc;"
| 60 || March 4 ||  @ Boston
| 
| Favors & Burke (16)
| Rudy Gobert (16)
| Trey Burke (8)
| TD Garden16,354
| 24–36
|- style="background:#cfc;"
| 61 || March 6 ||  @ Philadelphia
| 
| Gordon Hayward (25)
| Rudy Gobert (15)
| Gordon Hayward (4)
| Wells Fargo Center15,811
| 25–36
|- style="background:#cfc;"
| 62 || March 8 ||  @ Brooklyn
| 
| Gordon Hayward (24)
| Rudy Gobert (11)
| Rudy Gobert (5)
| Barclays Center17,041
| 26–36
|- style="background:#cfc;"
| 63 || March 10 ||  New York
| 
| Derrick Favors (12)
| Rudy Gobert (14)
| Joe Ingles (5)
| EnergySolutions Arena17,121
| 27–36
|- style="background:#cfc;"
| 64 || March 12 ||  Houston
| 
| Gordon Hayward (29)
| Rudy Gobert (22)
| Gordon Hayward (7) 
| EnergySolutions Arena18,781
| 28–36
|- style="background:#cfc;"
| 65 || March 14 ||  Detroit
| 
| Derrick Favors (26)
| Rudy Gobert (19)
| Dante Exum (5)
| EnergySolutions Arena19,911
| 29–36
|- style="background:#cfc;"
| 66 || March 16 ||  Charlotte
| 
| Rodney Hood (24)
| Rudy Gobert (22)
| Trey Burke (4)
| EnergySolutions Arena16,743
| 30–36
|- style="background:#fcc;"
| 67 || March 18 ||  Washington
| 
| Gordon Hayward (26)
| Rudy Gobert (14)
| Trey Burke (6)
| EnergySolutions Arena19,498
| 30–37
|- style="background:#cfc;"
| 68 || March 19 ||  @ L.A. Lakers
| 
| Gordon Hayward (22)
| Favors & Gobert (7)
| Gordon Hayward (5)
| Staples Center17,407
| 31–37
|- style="background:#fcc;"
| 69 || March 21 ||  @ Golden State
| 
| Derrick Favors (21)
| Derrick Favors (11)
| Gordon Hayward (7)
| Oracle Arena19,596
| 31–38
|- style="background:#fcc;"
| 70 || March 23 ||  Minnesota
| 
| Derrick Favors (19)
| Rudy Gobert (17)
| Trey Burke (6)
| EnergySolutions Arena19,911
| 31–39
|- style="background:#fcc;"
| 71 || March 25 ||  Portland
| 
| Derrick Favors (26)
| Derrick Favors (13)
| Trey Burke (3)
| EnergySolutions Arena19,911
| 31–40
|- style="background:#fcc;"
| 72 || March 27 ||  @ Denver
| 
| Gordon Hayward (24)
| Rudy Gobert (14)
| Trevor Booker (5)
| Pepsi Center15,312
| 31–41
|- style="background:#cfc;"
| 73 || March 28 ||  Oklahoma City
| 
| Trey Burke (22)
| Rudy Gobert (15)
| Gordon Hayward (5)
| EnergySolutions Arena19,911
| 32–41
|- style="background:#cfc;"
| 74 || March 30 ||  @ Minnesota
| 
| Gordon Hayward (22)
| Trevor Booker (13)
| Gordon Hayward (5)
| Target Center12,229
| 33–41

|- style="background:#cfc;"
| 75 || April 1 ||  Denver
| 
| Rudy Gobert (20)
| Rudy Gobert (12)
| Dante Exum (12)
| EnergySolutions Arena18,275
| 34–41
|- style="background:#fcc;"
| 76 || April 4 ||  @ Phoenix
| 
| Gordon Hayward (21)
| Rudy Gobert (15)
| Gordon Hayward (4)
| US Airways Center18,055
| 34–42
|- style="background:#cfc;"
| 77 || April 5 ||  @ Sacramento
| 
| Rodney Hood (25)
| Booker & Gobert (9)
| Dante Exum (6)
| Sleep Train Arena16,716
| 35–42
|- style="background:#cfc;"
| 78 || April 8 ||  Sacramento
| 
| Rodney Hood (20)
| Derrick Favors (11)
| Joe Ingles (6)
| EnergySolutions Arena18,351
| 36–42
|- style="background:#fcc;"
| 79 || April 10 ||  Memphis
| 
| Gordon Hayward (27)
| Rudy Gobert (14)
| Dante Exum (5)
| EnergySolutions Arena18,873
| 36–43
|- style="background:#cfc;"
| 80 || April 11 ||  @ Portland
| 
| Trevor Booker (36)
| Rudy Gobert (11)
| Rodney Hood (8)
| CenturyLink Arena19,908
| 37–43
|- style="background:#cfc;"
| 81 || April 13 ||  Dallas
| 
| Bryce Cotton (24)
| Rudy Gobert (17)
| Cotton & Hood (4)
| EnergySolutions Arena19,911
| 38–43
|- style="background:#fcc;"
| 82 || April 15 ||  @ Houston
| 
| Bryce Cotton (14)
| Rudy Gobert (8)
| Elijah Millsap (7)
| Toyota Center18,320
| 38–44

Player statistics

Summer League

|-
|}

Preseason

|-
|}

Regular season

|-
|}

Injuries

Transactions

Trades

Free agents

Re-signed

Additions

Subtractions

Awards

References

External links

 2014–15 Utah Jazz preseason at ESPN
 2014–15 Utah Jazz regular season at ESPN

Utah
Utah Jazz seasons
Utah
Utah